A Service Squadron (ServRon) was a United States Navy squadron that supported fleet combat ships and US Navy Auxiliary ships. Service Squadrons were used by the US Navy from their inception in 1943 to as late as the early 1980s. At the time of their inception during the Second World War they allowed the US Navy to operate across the vast reaches of the Pacific Ocean for extended periods of time. Service Squadrons created temporary forward bases to allow the naval squadrons to spend less time in transit and more time in the area of combat. Ulithi, a small volcanic atoll in the central Pacific, is an example of a site converted for use as a forward base of supply. Service Squadrons essentially created a major naval base near the area of operation. With naval bases like, Naval Base Ulithi, to refit, repair and resupply, many ships were able to deploy and operate in the western Pacific for a year or more without returning to a major port facility. Among the vessels operating in service squadrons were tankers, Fleet oilers, refrigerator  ships, ammunition ships, supply ships, floating docks and repair ships. They provided diesel, ordnance, aviation fuel, food stuffs and all other supplies. Equally important at places like Ulithi were the portable piers and floating dry docks which allowed many ships damaged by enemy action or Pacific storms to undergo repair without having to travel the thousands of miles back to a major US naval base. Ulithi was as far forward from the US naval base at San Francisco as the San Francisco base was from London, England. To have a fully functional major port in the middle of the Pacific was a significant aid to U.S. Navy operations.

The commander of the service squadron was responsible for the operation of all the ships, docks and repair yards in the squadron.  The Commander was referred to as ComServRon, with the title followed by the unit designation of his Squadron, such as ComServRon 10.

Service Squadrons were slowly disbanded in the late 1970s as fleet combat support functions were shifted to civilian operated Military Sealift Command.

War in the Pacific
Service squadrons played a vital role in the war in the Pacific during the Second World War.  The Pacific Ocean with its vast reaches was a significant obstacle to overcome.  In considering their war in the Pacific against the United States, the Japanese had counted on the fact that the size of the Pacific Ocean would in itself be a defense.  For the US Navy to conduct operations against the Japanese, all actions would necessarily be far from their home ports.  Travel to the area of combat would consume the fleet's supplies of fuel and food and limit the length of time US Navy assets could operate in the Western Pacific.  Japanese naval strategy ('Kantai Kessen') was built around the idea that this would present them with an opportunity to knock the US Navy out of the conflict with a single decisive action.  They sought such an opportunity throughout the war.

Creation of Service Squadrons
In his planning for how the war in the Pacific would be fought and won, Admiral Chester Nimitz knew the manufacturing might of the United States would eventually supply him with a force large enough to overcome the forces of the Empire of Japan. He referred to this future force as the 'Big Blue Fleet'.  To make it effective at projecting its power, he would need to devise a way to keep it supplied and in fighting condition. The ongoing resupply of a large naval force across the vast expanse of the Pacific would require the US Navy to perform something no navy had ever accomplished before.

In the autumn of 1943, Admiral Nimitz ordered the creation of two service squadrons. These two squadrons would provide mobile service to the fleet as it moved across the Pacific – with one service as fleet base while the second remained to the rear. As the fleet captured new sites the rear squadron would move to the front and act as fleet base. Commanding officer Commodore Worrall R. Carter devised the mobile service squadrons that made it possible for the navy to create repair facilities and re-supply facilities thousands of miles away from an actual Naval port.  He did this essentially by bringing the port to the navy.  Admiral Nimitz referred to Service Squadron 4 and Service Squadron 10 as his "secret weapons".

The destroyer tender , under the command of Captain Samuel Ogden, was the flagship for the squadron. The USS Cascade arrived at Funafuti on 21 November 1943 and remained there until February 1944. During this period Captain Worrall Reed Carter, was organizing the second service squadron, Service Squadron 10. Service Squadron 10 was commissioned on 15 January 1944 at Pearl Harbor.

Service Squadron 10 was commissioned on 15 January 1944 at Pearl Harbor. Service Squadron 1 and Service Squadron 3 operated in the Pacific Ocean.  Service Squadron 2 and Service Squadron 4 operated in the Atlantic Ocean. Service Squadron 10 worked with the United States Eighth Fleet in the Atlantic. Service Squadron 9 was formed on Pearl Harbor as a submarine chaser division.  Service Squadron 6 operated in the Mediterranean Sea.

Majuro

The Marshall Islands were considered the first major stepping stone for the battles across the Central Pacific to Japan. United States Marines were landed on 30 January 1944, but found that Japanese forces had previously evacuated their fortifications to Kwajalein and Enewetak about a year earlier.  The islands that made up the Majuro atoll were secured without incident.  Majuro had one of the largest natural anchorages in the Pacific.  It became the first major forward base for the US Pacific fleet and was the largest and most active port in the world until the war moved westward and Majuro became supplanted by Ulithi.

Kwajalein

After the capture of Kwajalein in February 1944 Cascade moved from Funafuti to Kwajalein.  On 17 March 1944 Squadron 4 was absorbed into Squadron 10. Captain Herbert Meyer Scull was reassigned as chief of staff for Rear Admiral Hoover, Commander Forward Area, Central Pacific. Captain Samuel Ogden in Cascade became representative "A" of Commander Service Squadron 10 in command of Kwajalein and Roi. Cascade remained at Kwajalein until May 1944 when she moved to Eniwetok.

Eniwetok

The United States captured Eniwetok in a five-day amphibious operation in February 1944.  Major combat occurred on Engebi Islet, which was the most important Japanese installation on the atoll. Combat also occurred on the main islet of Eniwetok itself, and on Parry Island, the site of a Japanese seaplane base.

Following its capture, the anchorage at Eniwetok became a major forward naval base for the U.S. Navy. On 5 June Commodore Carter joined ServRon 10 at Eniwetok.

During July 1944 there were a large number of vessels present at Eniwetok. The daily average of ships present during the first half of July was 488; during the second half of July the daily average number of ships at Eniwetok was 283. By the end of July Commodore Worrall R. Carter flew to Pearl Harbor to participate in planning the move of Servron 10 facilities from Eniwetok to Ulithi. By this point in the conflict, Commander Service Squadron 10 (ComServRon 10) had several hundred ships and floating equipment under his operational control, and had the largest staff afloat in the Pacific to help administrate responsibilities.

Manus

On 30 July 1944, representatives of Central Pacific Forces, headed by Commodore A.G. Quynn, met at Naval Base Manus, Admiralty Islands, with representatives of Commander Seventh Fleet, Commander Southwest Pacific Forces, and Naval Base Manus to discuss logistic support of Third Fleet units using Manus as a base in the Western Carolines operation. As a result, Captain S.B. Ogden was ordered to Manus as Commander Service Squadron Ten representative, bringing with him units necessary to service Third Fleet vessels. He left Kwajalein in the Marshalls on Argonne, Commander T.H. Escott, on 21 August and reached Seeadler Harbor on the 27th to set up his mobile base, using Argonne as his flagship.

Commander Third Fleet's logistic plan for Operation STALEMATE II, covering the capture of Peleliu, Ngesebus, Anguar, and Ulithi required that there should be available in Seeadler Harbor one 90,000-ton floating drydock, one 1,000-ton floating drydock, one destroyer tender, one repair ship, two 3,000-ton floating drydocks, and four floating workshops—two for hulls, two for machinery repairs, Besides these, there were added from time to time two destroyer tenders, one repair ship for internal combustion engines, four station tankers, one repair ship, two covered lighters, one water and one fuel oil barge, and two pontoon cranes.

Captain Ogden's responsibility, as Representative "A" of Commander Service Squadron Ten in charge of his Seeadler detachment, was to administer its activities in rendering logistic support. An example was the requirement that 24 oilers be present there for the striking forces, and the further requirement that the Area Petroleum Office of ComServPac effect delivery of 4,150,000 barrels of fuel oil at Manus in equal amounts throughout September. On 20 August 12 oilers left Eniwetok for Seeadler, carrying approximately 1,200,000 barrels of naval special, 84,000 barrels of Diesel oil, and 4,500,000 gallons of aviation gasoline. Commander ServRon Ten at Eniwetok immediately began preparations to send the second contingent of oilers, which left on the 27th and reached Seeadler the 31st. Captain Ogden handled the assignment of the tankers and apportioned delivery of fuel and petroleum products. He similarly administered the supply of fresh and frozen foods, dry provisions, dry stores, ammunition, fresh water, medical items, fleet freight, aviation supplies, and last but not least, repair facilities.

Following Argonne to Seeadler on 27 August were the unclassified vessels Silver Cloud, Caribou, Arethusa, and Armadillo, the water barge YW-90, and the ocean tug Tern towing the concrete barge YO-186. Caribou brought 65,000 barrels of fuel oil, Silver Cloud 85,000 and Arethusa 65,000; Armadillo 24,000 barrels of diesel oil and 1,770,000 gallons of aviation gasoline. YW-90 held 280,000 gallons of water, and the concrete YO-186 55,000 barrels. The fleet tug Tawasa towed in the floating drydock ARD-19, while the auxiliary ocean tug ATA-122 arrived towing the barges YF-681, filled with boatswain's stores of manila and wire line, blocks, tackle, mooring gear, etc., and YF-787 with general stores. Bringing in the drydock also meant bringing her in full, for while being towed from port to port her docking space furnished a wealth of cargo room for all sorts of equipment. On her trip from Eniwetok ARD-19 carried the little harbor tug YTL-208, two pontoon crane barges, 20 LCMs, and 20 LCVPs. Except for the crane barges all these were self-propelled, but none could have made its way across the ocean under its own power. Most of Ogden's detachment was sent down from Kwajalein and Eniwetok. Crane barges, small tugs, and landing craft were vital necessities for supply services within a harbor, and had to go forward.

Kossol Roads

For resupply in the combat area, the ammunition ships Mauna Loa and Shasta left Seeadler on 15 September for Kossol Passage, Palau Islands, and upon arrival on the 18th immediately began rearming battleships and cruisers of the Naval Gunfire Support Group. On 22 September Lassen also left Seeadler for Kossol, where she issued replacement ammunition to the support group and to Task Force 38.3. Most fire-support ships for STALEMATE were supplied in the Solomons, with the exception of the battleships Mississippi, which had been overhauled and loaded on the west coast, and Maryland, loaded at Pearl Harbor after completion of battle-damage repairs. Naval Base Tulagi reported for August 1944 that the magazine issued 2,600 tons of ammunition to destroyers, cruisers, and battleships, and 500 tons to landing craft. Tennessee, which collided on 23 August with California, was able to join the fire-support group after repair, but California did not leave Espiritu until 18 September.

Rehearsal for Phase I of STALEMATE for fire-support ships was held in the Cape Esperance area, Guadalcanal, 27 to 29 August. Sangay, with 2,936 tons of ammunition, arrived there from the west coast on 6 September, accompanied the group to the objective, and during the early hours of D-day, 15 September, lay off Peleliu Island ready to make issues. She remained in the vicinity until afternoon of the 21st, when she went to Kossol Passage, joining Mauna Loa and Shasta. Next day the three were joined by Lassen, and all four issued replacement ammunition to retiring vessels. By the 27th, 66 ships of various types were in Kossol Passage. Because of the total lack of anchorages in the vicinity of Anguar and Peleliu, Kossol proved a roadstead where ships could await call to unload at Peleliu, and also where replenishment of fuel, stores, and ammunition was accomplished. It was used extensively through October and November 1944 as a staging area en route from New Morotai (Operation INTERLUDE); ammunition was supplied at a number of bases in the area, and from 5 ammunition ships which visited Hollandia and Woendi during August and September.

Captain C.C. Laws, commanding the repair ship Prometheus, on 3 October became the Kossol Passage Representative of Service Squadron Ten.

Ulithi

Ulithi was perfectly positioned to act as a staging area for the US Navy's western Pacific operations. It is a typical volcanic atoll, with a coral reef, white sand beaches and palm trees. Ulithi's forty small islands barely rise above the sea, with the largest being only half a square mile in area. The anchorage was well situated, but there were no port facilities to repair ships or re-supply the fleet.

The survey ship  surveyed the lagoon and reported it capable of holding 700 vessels.  Service Squadron 10 was called upon to convert the lagoon into a serviceable naval station.  On 4 October 1944 the vessels of Service Squadron 10 began leaving Eniwetok for Ulithi.  

At Ulithi pontoon piers of a new design were built, each consisting of the 4-by-12-pontoon sections, filled with sand and gravel, and then sunk.  The pontoons were anchored in place by guy ropes to deadmen on shore, and by iron rods driven into the coral.  Connecting tie pieces ran across the tops of the pontoons to hold them together into a pier. Despite extremely heavy weather on several occasions these pontoon piers stood up remarkably well.  They gave extensive service, with little requirement for repairs. Piers of this type were also installed by the 51st Battalion to be used as aviation-gasoline mooring piers near the main airfield on Falalop.

On 8 October 1944 Commodore Worrall R. Carter's flagship Prairie, the merchant ammunition ship Plymouth Victory and Cascade sailed for Ulithi. Markab initially remained at Eniwetok, leaving for Ulithi on 18 October 1944 and arriving on 22 October.

Within a month of the occupation of Ulithi, a whole floating base was in operation.  Six thousand ship fitters, artificers, welders, carpenters, and electricians arrived aboard repair ships, destroyer tenders, and floating dry docks.  had an air-conditioned optical shop and a metal fabrication shop with a supply of base metals from which she could make any alloy to form any part needed. , which looked like a big tanker, distilled fresh water and baked bread and pies.  The ice cream barge made 500 gallons a shift. The dry docks towed to Ulithi were large enough to lift dry a 45,000-ton battleship. Fleet oilers sortied to and from Ulithi to meet the task forces at sea, refueling the warships a short distance from their combat operational areas.   The result was something never seen before: a vast floating service station enabling the entire Pacific fleet to operate indefinitely at unprecedented distances from its mainland bases. Service Squadron 10's conversion of the lagoon at Ulithi to a major naval resupply and staging area was one of the most remarkable feats of the war. In terms of the number of ships at one base, Naval Base Ulithi was the largest Naval Base in the world in 1944 and 1945, with over 617 ships at times. 

Ulithi became the undisclosed Pacific base for the major operations late in the war, including Leyte Gulf and the Okinawa operation.   The huge anchorage capacity was greater than either Majuro or Pearl Harbor, and over seven hundred ships anchored there at a time.  After Leyte Gulf was secured, the Pacific Fleet moved its forward staging area to Leyte at Leyte-Samar Naval Base.

In September 1944  arrived at Pearl Harbor to undergo conversion to flagship for Service Squadron 10. The ship was fitted with extensive radio and visual signaling equipment, with radio and coding rooms in the superstructure, and berths for the squadron commander, staff officers, and enlisted men below. The conversion was completed in October, and Ocelot sailed via Eniwetok for Ulithi where she spent the next six months providing an administrative post at the advanced base.

San Pedro Bay, Leyte

The movement of American forces closer to victory necessitated advancing support elements as well, and on 24 May 1945 Ocelot shifted to San Pedro Bay, Leyte.

The logistic work of Service Squadron Ten at Leyte should perhaps be briefly explained. While that was an area under the cognizance of the Seventh Fleet, which at that time did not come under the direct command of Admiral Nimitz, it was nevertheless a matter of brothers-in-arms cooperation to give support wherever possible. Therefore, because of shortage of the necessary service vessels in the Service Force Seventh Fleet, a detachment of Service Squadron Ten was sent to Leyte to help out. In this detachment was a floating drydock of 3,500 tons and another smaller one, as the shore-base development planned for the area was not far enough advanced to meet the requirements. Later, when the Third and Fifth Fleets based there, Service Squadron Ten moved in with a large detachment to take care of the logistics without drawing upon the shore base for anything except the occasional use of the battleship drydock at Samar.

Nearly all ships of the Southern Attack Force and the Western Islands Attack Group for the Okinawa operation assembled and loaded at Leyte. Initial plans designated Commander Service Force Seventh Fleet as the responsible service agency, and Commander Amphibious Group Twelve as responsible logistically for servicing the ships of the Joint Expeditionary Force staging at Leyte. When it became apparent that Seventh Fleet could not supply the needs of this force, Commander Service Squadron Ten's Representative A, Captain Ogden, was ordered from Kossol Roads to provide services for Nimitz's ships in the area. ComServFor Seventh Fleet provided additional services as requested by Captain Ogden.

Arriving 15 February 1945 in Argonne, Captain Ogden reported to Rear Admiral J.L. Hall, Jr., commanding Amphibious Group Twelve. Pending arrival of additional service-force units, conferences were held to obtain an overall grasp of the problems involved. It was determined that sufficient quantities of everything required were either available or could be made so at Leyte. All ships had to be provisioned before the training and rehearsal period, and topped off just before departure to the objective. Schedules were interrupted by foul weather and the late arrival of some of the ships from Iwo Jima. The distances from troop embarkation points to the logistic anchorage, 15 to 30 miles, added to the problem.

Maintenance facilities available to staging forces were the destroyer tenders Dixie and Markab; one limited repair ship, Argonne; two repair ships, the Hector and Prometheus; one internal-combustion-engine repair ship; and two floating drydocks. Two landing-craft repair ships, Egeria and Endymion, which were assigned to the amphibious group, were available after 1 March. Because of the limited time in which to accomplish essential repairs and the length of time required to load ships, it was decided to place one repair ship in each of the two loading areas so that a maximum of work could be accomplished prior to departure. Work on small craft was undertaken by three of the other repair ships.

The total number of ships to be serviced at Leyte was 432, some—ships newly reporting from the United States—needing little attention, others considerable, especially amphibious craft returning from Iwo Jima. Of the floating drydocks, both brought forward from Kossol, ARD-16 was unavailable for the staging work because it contained the battle-damaged destroyer Renshaw. Consequently, ARD-17 carried most of this type of work, with Seventh Fleet facilities used on several occasions. To complete what would normally be the necessary drydock work every available diver was used. Because of experience gained with many small ships in this staging, a definite need was indicated of having small drydocks of 1,000 tons and pontoon docks to reinforce the 3,500-ton ARDs.

Saipan

At Saipan in addition to the floating facilities of Squadron Ten there was a tank farm for 150,000 barrels of black oil, 30,000 of diesel, and 900,000 gallons of aviation gasoline, a supply depot of 64 steel warehouses  each, plus 11 refrigerator units of  each. The naval ammunition depot had 112 steel magazines, 4 torpedo magazines, and considerable open storage. An amphibious-vessel repair base comprised five shops 40 × 100 feet each in floor space, a 12-ton crane on a pontoon barge, a 6 × 18 pontoon drydock, and additional fuel storage of four 10,000-barrel diesel tanks and two 1,000 barrel tanks for aviation gasoline. A small-boat repair unit with 4 × 15 pontoon drydock had a mobile machine shop. There was also a special small-boat pool and an LVT repair facility run by the amphibious force, two 75-ton cranes on 6 × 18 pontoon lighters, and a pier for handling ammunition between ship and shore.

Buckner Bay, Okinawa

On 13 September Ocelot moved westward again, to Buckner Bay, Okinawa as the forward supply followed the course of the conflict finally to the home waters of Japan. Shortly after arrival there the facilities were struck by Typhoon Louise and a number of vessels were lost. Ocelot was forced aground and its back was broken. Command was shifted to another vessel and the job of keeping the navy supplied continued.

 Service Squadrons 
Service Squadron 1 in 1941 in Pearl Harbor had, many other ships were added to the Squadron during World War 2:
Tugboats: Type V ship
USS Kalmia (AT-23)
USS Algorma (AT-34)
USS Iuka (AT-37)
USS Cherokee (AT-66)
Repair ships:
USS Vulcan (AR-5)
USS Redwing (ARS-4)
USS Warbler (ARS-11)
USS Willet (ARS-12)
USS Wyoming (AG-17)
Hospital Ship:
USS Relief (AH-1)

Service Squadron 7 in 1941 in Pearl Harbor had, many other ships were added to the Squadron during World War 2:
Ammunition ship
USS Nitro (AE-23)
USS Kilauea (AE-4)
Stores ships:
USS Yukon (AF-9)
USS Polaris (AF-11)
USS Mizar (AF-12)
USS Tarazed (AF-13)
USS Pollux (AKS-2)
USS Arcturus (AK-12)
USS Alchiba (AK-23)
USS Algorab (AK-25)
USS Betelgeuse (AK-28)
Fleet Oiler:
USS Patoka (AO-9)
USS Sapelo (AO-11)
USS Kaweah (AO-15)
USS Laramie (AO-16)
USS Mattole (AO-17)
USS Rapidan (AO-18)
USS Salinas (AO-19)
USS Salamonie (AO-26)
USS Chemung (AO-30)
USS Cimarron (AO-22)
USS Guadalupe (AO-32)

Marine Service Squadron
Marine Service Squadron (SMS), were operated by the United States Marine Corps. Marine Aircraft Group 93 (MAG-93). Marine Service Squadron was aviation group established during World War II and serviced in the Korean war also. Marine Aircraft Groupkoreanwar2.org On November 1942, Marine Service Squadron 25 (SMS-25) was activated to provide maintenance for the group. Marine Service Squadron 33, SMS-33, operated in the Korean war. Marine Aviation Logistics Squadron 11 became Service Squadron on 1 September 1924. 

See also
ComServPac
List of unclassified miscellaneous vessels of the United States Navy - many vessels used by service squadrons held this hull classification
Special Service Squadron

 References 

Citations 

Bibliography 
 
 Carter, Worrall Reed, Dan A Kimball and Raymond Spruance Beans, bullets, and black oil : the story of fleet logistics afloat in the Pacific during World War II.  Annapolis, Dept. of the Navy, 1953.
 Wildenberg, Thomas, Gray steel and black oil : fast tankers and replenishment at sea in the U.S. Navy, 1912–1995''. Annapolis, Md: Naval Institute Press, 1996.

Military logistics units and formations of the United States Navy
Ship squadrons of the United States Navy
+